The 2016 Tour de Romandie was a road cycling stage race that took place in the Romandie region of Switzerland between 26 April and 1 May 2016. It was the 70th edition of the Tour de Romandie cycling stage race and the 14th event in the 2016 UCI World Tour. The defending champion was 's Ilnur Zakarin.

The race included six stages. The first of these is a prologue individual time trial; the five stages that follow include two summit finishes and another, hilly time trial.

Route

Participating teams
As the Tour de Romandie is a UCI World Tour event, all eighteen UCI Pro Teams were invited automatically and obliged to enter a team into the race. Other squads will also be given wildcard places into the race.

Pre-race favourites
Pre-race favorites are Chris Froome, Simon Špilak, Nairo Quintana, Richie Porte, Ilnur Zakarin, Thibaut Pinot,  Tom Dumoulin, Tejay van Garderen, Geraint Thomas, Rafał Majka, Rui Costa.

Stages

Prologue
26 April 2016 — La Chaux-de-Fonds, individual time trial (ITT)

Stage 1
27 April 2016 — Mathod to Moudon,

Stage 2
28 April 2016 — Moudon to Morgins, 

Nairo Quintana has claimed victory on Stage 2 due to Ilnur Zakarin being relegated to second for changing his line in the sprint to the finish.

Stage 3
29 April 2016 — Sion,  individual time trial (ITT)

Stage 4
30 April 2016 — Conthey to Villars-sur-Ollon,

Stage 5
1 May 2016 — Ollon to Geneva,

Classifications

In the Tour de Romandie, four jerseys are awarded. The general classification was calculated by adding up each cyclist's finishing times on each stage. Time bonuses were awarded to the first three finishers on road stages (stages 2–5): the stage winner won a ten-second bonus, with six and four seconds for the second and third riders respectively. No bonus seconds were awarded at intermediate sprints. The leader of the general classification received a yellow jersey. This classification was considered the most important of the Tour, and the winner of the classification was considered the winner of the race. The young rider classification was based on the general classification: the highest-ranked rider born after 1 January 1990 was the leader of the classification and wore a white jersey.

There was a mountains classification; the leader of this competition wore a pink jersey. Over the road stages of the race, there were 15 classified climbs, each of which was ranked as first-category, second-category or third-category. The first riders to cross the summit of the climbs won points towards the mountain classification. On first-category climbs, the first five riders won points with the first of these winning 12 points. Points were also awarded to the first five riders across the summit of second-category climbs, though the winner only won 8 points. On third-category climbs, only the first four riders won points, with the first rider winning five points. There was also a points classification. On each of the road stages, there were two intermediate sprints. The first rider in these sprints won 6 points; the second rider won 3 points; the third rider won 1 point. No points were awarded at stage finishes. The winner of the classification won a green jersey.

The final individual classification was a combativity prize. After each road stage, a jury chose the rider on the basis of sportsmanship and effort in the stage. The rider was awarded a red dossard (race number) for the following stage. After the final stage, the jury chose the most combative rider of the race overall.

The final classification was a team classification. This was calculated by adding together the times of the best three riders on each team in each stage except the team time trial. In this stage, the team's finishing time was that of the fifth rider across the line.

References

Bibliography

External links
 

Tour de Romandie
Tour de Romandie
Tour de Romandie